Routledge is an Anglo-Scottish surname.

Variants
Common variant spellings include Rutledge, Ratledge, Ruttledge and Rutlidge. Dozens of other spellings are attested in historical records.

History
The surname was first recorded in the 15th century in Scotland along the Anglo-Scottish border, in Liddesdale and the towns of Roxburgh, Hawick and Cavers on the River Teviot. Early Routledges were border reivers. In the 16th century, after their land was destroyed in the Rough Wooing, the family fled across the border and settled in Kilham, Northumberland and Bewcastle and Lanercost, Cumberland. In the 17th century, some Routledges were sent to Ulster. From Ireland, some immigrated to North America and France in the 17th century, and later Australia in the late 18th century.

Geographical distribution
There are approximately 7,100 Routledges worldwide, with the majority residing in England (4,500). In England, the highest concentration of Routledges is in the north, in Cumbria, Northumberland, Tyne and Wear and County Durham. Other Routledges are in Canada (890), the United States (580), Australia (540) and Scotland (220) (with most living near the border, in Scottish Borders and Dumfries and Galloway).

The Rutledge variant is most common in the diaspora and overall, with 41,000 people bearing the name worldwide, primarily in the United States (35,000), but also Canada (2,900), Australia (1,000), England (620), New Zealand (350), Ireland (220) and Northern Ireland (200).

1,200 people are named Ratledge, 990 of whom are in the United States. England is home to another 180 Ratledges.

430 people are named Ruttledge, which is most frequent in Ireland (140), and also found in England (130) and the United States (110).

People with the surname Routledge

Entertainers
 Alison Routledge (born 1960), New Zealand actress
 Anna Mae Routledge, Canadian actress
 Ian Routledge, fictional character on the Australian soap opera Home and Away
 Jordan Routledge, British actor
 Patricia Routledge (born 1929), English actress, comedian and singer

Politics
 Edmund Routledge (1843–1899), British publisher and politician
 George Albert Routledge (1855–1924), Canadian politician from Ontario
 Janet Routledge, Canadian politician from British Columbia
 Nozizwe Madlala-Routledge (born 1952), South African politician

Scientists
 Michael Routledge, environmental toxicologist
 Donald Routledge Hill (1922–1994), engineer and historian
 Joshua Routledge, (1773–1829), English engineer and inventor of the Engineer's Slide Rule
 Katherine Routledge (1866–1935), English archaeologist, surveyor of Easter Island
 Norman Routledge (1928–2013), English mathematician and schoolteacher
 William Scoresby Routledge (1859–1939), anthropologist, husband of Katherine Routledge

Sports
 Ben Fisk-Routledge (born 1993), Canadian soccer player
 Bill Routledge (1907–1972), English footballer
 Jon Routledge (born 1989), English footballer
 Raymond Routledge (1931–2008), American bodybuilder, 1961 Mr. America
 Thomas Routledge (1867–1927), English born South African test cricketer
 Wayne Routledge (born 1985), English footballer

Other
 George Routledge (1812–1888), English publisher, founder of the Routledge imprint
 William Routledge (priest), Scottish Episcopalian priest

See also
 Routledge, a British book imprint
 Ratledge
 Rutledge (disambiguation)
 Ruttledge

Notes

References

Routledge
Routledge